Sedentaria is a diverse clade of annelid worms. It is traditionally treated as a subclass of the paraphyletic class Polychaeta, but it is also a monophyletic group uniting several polychaetes and the monophyletic class Clitellata. It is the sister group of Errantia.

Phylogeny
The phylogeny of polychaetes is slowly being resolved. Sedentaria and Errantia are the two biggest clades of polychaetes, and together they compose clade Pleistoannelida. Sedentaria's most basal clade is Orbiniida. Other groups that are nested within Sedentaria are: Clitellata, the Sabellida/Spionida clade, Opheliida, Echiura, Cirratuliformia, Terebelliformia, Maldanomorpha and the families Siboglinidae and Capitellidae.

Some taxa, such as Spintheridae and Myzostomida, are still difficult to place due to their long branching, but they likely belong to either Errantia or Sedentaria.

References

Polychaetes
Annelids